Martin Armstrong may refer to:

Martin Armstrong (writer) (1882–1974), English writer and poet
Martin Armstrong (surveyor) (1739–1802), soldier in the American Revolution, surveyor in Tennessee
Martin A. Armstrong (born 1949), American financial analyst